Closer to Truth is a continuing television series on PBS and public television originally created, produced and hosted by Robert Lawrence Kuhn. The first premiere series aired in 2000 for 2 seasons, followed by a second series aired in 2003 for a single season. Kuhn's presentation, Asking Ultimate Questions, is the foundation of Closer To Truth.

The third series of the program, Closer to Truth: Cosmos. Consciousness. God, launched in 2008, with 20 full seasons to date. Kuhn is the creator, executive producer, writer and presenter of the series. Peter Getzels is the co-creator and producer / director.

The show is centered on on-camera conversations with leading scientists, philosophers, theologians, and scholars, covering a diverse range of topics or questions from the size and nature of the universe (or multiverse), to the existence and essence of God, to the mystery of consciousness and the notion of free will.

Episodes

Series One: "Closer to Truth"

Season 1 (2000)

Season 2 (2000)

Series Two: "Closer to Truth: Science, Meaning and the Future"

Season 1 (2003)

Series Three: "Closer to Truth: Cosmos. Consciousness. God."

Season 1 (2008)

Season 2 (2008)

Season 3 (2009)

Season 4 (2009)

Season 5 (2010)

Season 6 (2010)

Season 7 (2011)

Season 8 (2011)

Season 9 (2012)

Season 10 (2012)

Season 11 (2013)

Season 12 (2013)

Season 13 (2014)

Season 14 (2015)

Season 15 (2015)

Season 16 (2016)

Season 17 (2017)

Season 18 (2017-2018)

Season 19 (2019)

Season 20 (2020)

References

External links
 
 

Lists of American non-fiction television series episodes